The following is a list of Sociedade Esportiva Palmeiras managers.

 Filpo Núñez
 Dudu
 Osvaldo Brandão (1945), (1947 – 1948)
 Aymoré Moreira (1951 – 1952)
 Osvaldo Brandão (1958 – 1960)
 Rubens Minelli (1969 – 1971)
 Osvaldo Brandão (1971 – 1975)
 Telê Santana (1979 – 1982)
 Osvaldo Brandão (1980)
 Rubens Minelli (1982 – 1983)
 Mário Travaglini (1984 – 1985)
 Chinesinho (1985)
 Jair Pereira (1990)
 Dudu (1990)
 Rubens Minelli (1987 – 1988)
 Dudu (1990 – 1991)
 Telê Santana (1990)
 Marcos Falopa (1990)
 Paulo César Carpegiani (1991)
 Nelsinho Baptista (1991 – 1992)
 Otacílio (1992 – 1993)
 Vanderlei Luxemburgo (1993 – 1994)
 Valdir Espinosa (1995)
 Carlos Alberto Silva (1995)
 Vanderlei Luxemburgo (1995 – 1996)
 Márcio Araújo (1997)
 Luiz Felipe Scolari (1 January 1998 – 30 June 2000)
 Flávio Murtosa (30 June 2000 – 2000)
 Marco Aurélio Moreira (2000 – 2001)
 Márcio Araújo (2001)
 Celso Roth (2001)
 Vanderlei Luxemburgo (2002)
 PC Gusmão (2002)
 Flávio Murtosa (2002)
 Levir Culpi (2002 – 31 December 2002)
 Jair Picerni (January 2003  –  May 2004)
 Estevam Soares (25 May 2004 – 5 February 2005)
 Candinho (5 February 2005 – 21 April 2005)
 Paulo Bonamigo (21 April 2005 – 17 July 2005)
 Émerson Leão (18 July 2005 – 4 April 2006)
 Marcelo Vilar (4 April 2006 – 17 May 2006)
 Tite (17 May 2006 – 22 September 2006)
 Jair Picerni (22 September 2006 – 9 December 2006)
 Caio Júnior (9 December 2006 – 17 December 2007)
 Vanderlei Luxemburgo (1 January 2008 – 27 June 2009)
 Jorginho (27 June 2009 – 21 July 2009)
 Muricy Ramalho (21 July 2009 – 18 February 2010)
 Antônio Carlos (19 February 2010 – 18 May 2010)
 Jorge Parraga (18 May 2010 – 13 June 2010)
 Luiz Felipe Scolari (13 June 2010 – 13 September 2012)
 Narciso dos Santos (13 September 2012 – 19 September 2012)
 Gilson Kleina (19 September 2012 – 8 May 2014)
 Alberto Valentim (May 2014)
 Ricardo Gareca (May 2014  –  August 2014)
 Alberto Valentim (August 2014)
 Dorival Júnior (August 2014  –  December 2014)
 Oswaldo de Oliveira (January 2015 – 9 June 2015)
 Alberto Valentim (9 June 2015 – 15 June 2015)
 Marcelo Oliveira (15 June 2015 – 12 March 2016)
 Cuca (12 March 2016 – 11 December 2016)
 Eduardo Baptista (11 December 2016 – 4 May 2017)
 Cuca (10 May 2017 – 13 October 2017)
 Alberto Valentim (13 October 2017– 5 December 2017)
 Roger Machado Marques (22 November 2017– 26 July 2018)
 Luiz Felipe Scolari (27 July 2018– 2 September 2019)
 Mano Menezes (4 September 2019– 2 December 2019)
 Andrey Lopes (2 December 2019 – 15 December 2019)
 Vanderlei Luxemburgo (15 December 2019 – 14 October 2020)
 Andrey Lopes (14 October 2020 – 30 October 2020)
 Abel Ferreira (30 October 2020 – Present)

References

External links
 Palmeiras Official Site 
 Palestrinos 

Palmeiras
Managers